The Adam and Gila Milstein Family Foundation (MFF) is a Los Angeles, California-based nonprofit foundation which aims to strengthen the State of Israel and its ties to the United States of America, as well as to strengthen the Jewish identity of American Jews and their connection to Israel. 

Israeli-American real estate investor Adam Milstein and his wife Gila established the foundation in 2000.

Overview 
In 2000, the Milsteins founded MFF, which is based in Los Angeles. Adam Milstein serves as the president of the foundation.

The mission of the foundation is to educate and train students and young professionals to identify with their Jewish roots and to connect with and advocate for the State of Israel. The foundation has three main operating principles: "Active Philanthropy," "Life Path Impact," and "Philanthropic Synergy". "Active Philanthropy" means that the foundation remains actively involved, investing time and resources to ensure the impact and success of the organizations, projects, and programs they support.

The foundation funds and supports dozens of organizations, often in concert with several other philanthropic organizations.

The foundation also offers grants to support students on college campuses. The grants are available to help fund cultural events, coalition-building initiatives, campaigns and social media activism led by students.

Initiatives
In partnership with the American-Israel Educational Foundation (AIEF), the educational wing of the American Israel Public Affairs Committee (AIPAC), MFF created the Campus Allies Mission to Israel and the Campus Allies delegation to AIPAC's annual Policy Conference. The initiatives "engage African-American, Christian, and Latino student leaders and educate them to become advocates for Israel." The Campus Allies Mission to Israel is for non-Jewish, pro-Israel student leaders and activists who have not been to Israel and are ineligible for Birthright Israel.

In December 2015, MFF partnered with the Israeli Video Network to launch an "Inspired by Israel" video contest, with the purpose of showcasing how people are inspired by Israel.

The foundation provided the staff support and funding behind the Talk Israel mobile app, which launched in December 2015 with the goal to "bring the pro-Israel community together."

In July 2017, MFF launched its "Milstein Meme Competition" in an effort to find the "funny side of pro-Israel activism." Adam Milstein said, "This contest is a fun way for us to express our love and support for Israel with wit and levity."

In January 2018, the foundation launched the website Virtually Israel 2.0, which hosts virtual reality tours of popular sites in Israel. Adam Milstein said the videos show "Israel is not a war zone" but "a place of peace and prosperity and happiness and innovation, a place that anybody should go and enjoy."

Supported organizations 
According to MFF's webpage, the organizations that it supports include:

 Academic Exchange
 Aish Los Angeles
 Algemeiner
 AMCHA Initiative
 Birthright Israel
 Foundation for Defense of Democracies
 Israel Allies Foundation

See also 
 Steinhardt Foundation for Jewish Life

References

External links 
 

Foundations based in the United States
Organizations established in 2000
Israel–United States relations
Zionist organizations
Israel friendship associations
Zionism in the United States
Non-governmental organizations involved in the Israeli–Palestinian conflict
2000 establishments in California